In United States v. Ingalls (1947), 73 F. Supp. 76 (S.D. Cal. 1947), the Civil Rights Section of the Department of Justice prosecuted a Thirteenth Amendment case – a Reconstruction era amendment which prohibited slavery and involuntary servitude except as a punishment for a crime. This was the first case using the Thirteenth Amendment in the 20th century.

Background 
In 1908, Mrs. Mira Elizabeth Ingalls, a white woman, discovered that her husband was having a sexual relationship with Dora Jones, their then 17-year-old African-American maid. After divorcing her husband, Ingalls blackmailed Jones into continuing to work as her maid. Ingalls told Jones that if she tried to leave she would have her arrested. Ernest Tolin, the assistant attorney who prosecuted the case, quoted Mrs. Ingalls telling Jones – "You owe me your life because you have ruined mine." Authorities claimed that Mrs. and Mr. Ingalls had not paid Jones any compensation since 1909 and that Jones' sleeping quarters were so cold "a subsequent tenant would not keep her cat in the room." The abuse spanned a total of 37 years and across different places including, San Diego, Boston, Washington, and Chicago. In 1946, Mrs. Helen Roberts, Mrs. Ingalls's daughter, encouraged Jones to tell Berkeley authorities of her treatment after seeing that Jones' was “thin, tired looking, and her ankles were badly swollen” during a visit from her mother, stepfather, and Jones.

Decision 
Mrs. Ingalls did not serve prison time but was ordered by a judge to pay Jones $6,000 in compensation for lost wages.

References 

 "Coronado women's vengeance to maid disclosed: FBI bared 37 years of slavery,” San Diego Union (San Diego, CA), September 22, 1958, A 13–15.
 Goluboff, Risa L. "The Thirteenth Amendment in Historical Perspective." U. Pa. J. Const. L. 11 (2008): 1451.

External links 
Text of United States v. Ingalls is available on Justia

United States Thirteenth Amendment case law
1947 in United States case law